The 2019 Hlinka Gretzky Cup was an under-18 international ice hockey tournament that was held in Piešťany, Slovakia and Břeclav, Czech Republic from 5 to 10 August 2019 at Alcaplast Arena in Břeclav and Easton Arena in Piešťany. Team Russia won the gold medal for the first time since 1995 with a 3–2 defeat against Canada in the final.

Preliminary round
All times are Central European Summer Time (UTC+2).

Group A

Group B

Final round

Semifinal playoff bracket 

The semi-finals were decided on 7 August, 2019 after Group A and B completed three round-robin games each. The winner of Group A (Canada) played the runner-up of Group B (Sweden), while the winner of Group B (Russia) played the runner-up of Group A (Finland). The semifinals were held on 9 August 2019 and the gold medal and bronze medal games were held the following day on 10 August 2019.

Seventh place game

Fifth place game

Semifinals

Bronze medal game

Final

Statistics

Top scorers
List shows the top ten skaters sorted by points, then goals.

 GP = Games played; G = Goals; A = Assists; Pts = Points; +/− = Plus-minus; PIM = Penalties In MinutesSource: hlinkagretzkycup.cz

Final ranking

Broadcasting

Canada 
 TSN (online streaming available)
 Sportsnet

Russia 

 http://www.fhr.ru (online video streaming)

References 

Hlinka Gretzky Cup
2019
International ice hockey competitions hosted by Slovakia
International ice hockey competitions hosted by the Czech Republic
Ivan
Ivan
Hlinka Gretzky Cup
Hlinka Gretzky Cup